The Aquinas College of Higher Studies also known as Aquinas University College is a Sri Lankan nonprofit private Tertiary education institute that provides both academic degrees and vocational training.

History 
The Aquinas College of Higher Studies was founded in 1953 by Catholic priests Peter A. Pillai the former rector of St.Joseph's College and Thomas Cooray the Archbishop of Colombo as a Catholic university open to all ethnic and religious groups. It was registered in 1954 by the Ministry of Education Ceylon and was established in Colombo 8.

Initially it offered external degrees from local state universities such as Universities of Kelaniya, Peradeniya, Colombo and Sri Jayewardenepura as well as foreign universities while agricultural training was carried out in the 47 acre farm in Walpola, Ragama.  After 2005 when it received approval to grant degrees Aquinas moved on to develop its own degree programs. Since then it has expanded both degree programs and infrastructure as well as attracting students from SAARC countries.

Organisation 
The Aquinas College of Higher Studies is run as nonprofit philanthropic institution administered by the Archdiocese of Colombo. The College also works in close collaboration with foreign Universities and Higher Educational Authorities. It is accredited to provide its own academic degrees by the University Grants Commission (UGC)  and is registered with the Tertiary and Vocational Educational Commission (TVEC) to provide vocational education.

Faculties

Faculty of Agriculture 

 Department of Agri-Business Management
 Department of Crop Management
 Department of Livestock Management

Faculty of Business and Hospitality Management 

 Department of Business Management
 Department of Hospitality Management

Faculty of Education & English 

 Department of Education
 Department of English

Faculty of Science And Technology 

 Department of Information & Communication Technology
 Department of Nursing & Pharmacy

Faculty of Social Sciences And Humanities 

 Department of Humanities
 Department of Psychology
 Department of Religious Studies
 Department of Sister Formation

References

1954 establishments in Ceylon
Educational institutions established in 1954
Agricultural universities and colleges
Universities and colleges in Colombo District
Vocational universities and colleges
Universities in Sri Lanka